This is a list of members of the Western Australian Legislative Council from 22 May 1916 to 21 May 1918. The chamber had 30 seats made up of ten provinces each electing three members, on a system of rotation whereby one-third of the members would retire at each biennial election.

In March 1917, the Labor Party split over the matter of military conscription, with a number of Labor members of Parliament either resigning from the Party or being expelled. By May 1917, they had formed a new National Labor Party with a base in the Goldfields region, historically the heart of the Labor vote in Western Australia. In June 1917, they formed a coalition with the new Nationalist Party (which replaced the former Liberal Party) and the Country Party to form a governing coalition in the Legislative Assembly. With these arrangements, another Ministry was formed under new Premier Henry Lefroy.

Notes
 On 19 February 1916, South-West Province Liberal MLC John Winthrop Hackett died. Liberal candidate John Ewing won the resulting by-election, which was called to coincide with the 1916 Council elections.
 At the 13 May 1916 election, Labor candidate James Griffiths was elected to the North-East Province seat, but died on 21 June 1916 before he could be sworn in. Labor candidate James Cunningham was returned unopposed on 7 July 1916.
 On 27 July 1916, East Province Liberal MLC Hal Colebatch was appointed Colonial Secretary and Minister for Education in the new Ministry led by Frank Wilson. He was therefore required to resign and contest a ministerial by-election, at which he was returned unopposed on 9 August 1916.
 At the 13 May 1916 elections, the East Province election had resulted in a tie between Vernon Hamersley, the sitting member, and the Country Party candidate Michael McCabe, and Hamersley was declared elected on the casting vote of the returning officer. On 1 August 1916, the Court of Disputed Returns declared the election null and void, and a by-election was held on 2 September 1916 which resulted in Hamersley's return with a 324-vote majority on a significantly higher turnout.
 On 25 July 1916, North Province Independent MLC Francis Connor died. Independent candidate George Miles was elected unopposed on 18 September 1916.
 On 27 March 1917, Metropolitan Province Liberal MLC Arthur Jenkins died. Liberal candidate Harry Boan was elected unopposed on 14 April 1917.
 On 31 March 1917, South-East Province Liberal MLC Joseph Cullen died. Country Party candidate Hector Stewart won the resulting by-election on 19 May 1917.
 On 21 February 1918, Metropolitan Province Nationalist MLC Harry Boan resigned after ten months in office. Nationalist candidate John Nicholson won the resulting by-election on 23 March 1918.

Sources
 
 
 

Members of Western Australian parliaments by term